Endemic Bird Areas of the World: Priorities for Biodiversity Conservation represents an effort to document in detail the endemic biodiversity conservation importance of the world's Endemic Bird Areas.

The authors are Alison J. Stattersfield, Michael J. Crosby, Adrian J. Long, and David C. Wege, with a foreword by Queen Noor of Jordan. Endemic Bird Areas of the World: Priorities for Biodiversity Conservation contains 846 pages, and is a 1998 publication by Birdlife International, No. 7 in their Birdlife Conservation Series.

Six Introductory Sections
The book has six introductory sections: 
 "Biodiversity and Priority setting"
 "Identifying Endemic Bird Areas"
 "Global Analyses"
 "The Prioritization of Endemic Bird Areas"
 "The Conservation Relevance of Endemic Bird Areas"
 "Endemic Bird Areas as Targets for Conservation Action"

Six Regional Introductions
These are then followed by six Regional Introductions, in which Endemic Bird Areas are grouped into six major regions:
 North and Central America
 South America
 Africa, Europe, and the Middle East
 Continental Asia
 South-east Asian Islands, New Guinea and Australia
 Pacific Islands

Endemic Bird Areas
The bulk of the book consists of accounts of each of the 218 Endemic Bird Areas. Each account contains the following information:
 summary statistics about the EBA
 A "General Characteristics" section
 A section giving an overview of the restricted-range endemic bird species found in the EBA
 A Threats and Conservation section describing the threats posed to the EBA's biodiversity interest, and any significant measure in which are in place to counter these
 An annotated list of the restricted-range endemics found in the EBA

Secondary Bird Areas
The book concludes with a short section giving brief details of 138 secondary areas, again grouped into the six regions.

Details
Endemic Bird Areas of the World: Priorities for Biodiversity Conservation follows on from work presented in the 1992 publication Putting biodiversity on the map: priority areas for global conservation.

See also
Endemic Bird Area
List of endemic bird areas of the world
List of secondary endemic bird areas of the world
List of birds
Lists of endemic birds
Lists of birds by region
Category: Lists of endemic birds by region
Category: Lists of birds
Endemism
Biodiversity

Literature relating to endemism in birds
Ornithological literature
Environmental non-fiction books
Biodiversity
1998 non-fiction books
1998 in the environment
Endemism in birds
BirdLife International